Creative Folkestone Quarterhouse (also known as Quarterhouse) is a performance and exhibition space in Folkestone, Kent, England. It is used for activities including theatre, dance, music, film, comedy, family shows, and live screenings from organisations including National Theatre and Royal Opera House. The venue is also home to numerous festivals, including Creative Folkestone Book Festival, Normal? Festival of the Brain, and SALT Festival of the Sea and Environment.

Building

Design
The Quarterhouse was the first built part of a masterplan for the Folkestone harbour area produced by architects Foster and Partners. It was envisioned as a link between Tontine Street and the town centre. Kent County Council provided a £3.5 million grant for the Quarterhouse. The South East England Development Agency (SEEDA) provided a further £500,000.

In December 2005, Creative Folkestone selected a design by Alison Brooks Architects (ABA) for a building to serve as Folkestone’s “living room”. This was the culmination of a two-stage national competition to select a design of the Quarterhouse.

Planning constraints
In August 2007, a hearing at Shepway District Council Committee culminated in a unanimous vote to award planning permission for a new building at the site, previously occupied by a builder's yard. Permission was granted despite a recommendation by the council's planning department for the exterior mesh cladding to be removed.

The building is located in Folkestone Leas and Bayle Conservation area. It contains two structurally and acoustically isolated boxes – an inner one and an outer one. This prevents noise travelling out of and into the building. Inspired by scallop shells, the fluted mesh cladding is backlit at night bookending a curved east façade of Georgian buildings on Tontine Street.

The design was further developed through 2006, with on-site work starting in early summer 2007. Construction was completed in February 2009.

Facilities
The Quarterhouse comprises:
 a 220-seat, 490-standing multi-purpose auditorium. The brief had called for 250 seats, but this was reduced due to space constraints
 ground floor foyer and exhibition space
 first floor cafe/bar
 a top floor business enterprise centre – including 13 small offices of approximately 15 square metres each, shared reception and meeting room

In addition to its auditorium, Quarterhouse houses Creative Folkestone's administrative offices and the Creative Folkestone Triennial.

Artworks 
Quarterhouse is also home to three public artworks in the Creative Folkestone Artworks collection, installed during successive Creative Folkestone Triennials. Yoko Ono’s Skyladder, installed for the 2014 Triennial, is an ‘instruction’ work, an invitation to the people of Folkestone, exhibited in the Quarterhouse Bar.

On the first floor, London-based architects Studio Ben Allen installed The Clearing as part of the 2017 Triennial. Comprising 16 vertical gothic wooden tree-like forms, creating a cathedral-like visitor centre for the café bar, it is now a permanent part of the Creative Folkestone Artworks collection.

On the roof, there is one of the five sculptures called Pent House by artists Diane Dever and Jonathan Wright.

Awards 
RIBA Stirling Prize Midlist 2009
RIBA National Award 2009
RIBA South East Regional Award 2009
Alison Brooks won the AJ100 Contribution to the Profession Award in 2017

References 

Folkestone
Performing arts centres in the United Kingdom